Jan Gerritsz van Bronckhorst (also Bronchorst or Bronkhorst; 1603–1661) was a Dutch Golden Age painter and engraver. He is considered today to be a minor member of the Utrecht Caravaggisti.

Biography
According to Arnold Houbraken, van Bronckhorst apprenticed as an eleven-year-old with the glass engraver Verburgh in Utrecht. He worked with him for 6 months and worked with two other Utrecht glassworkers before embarking on a Grand Tour in 1620.  He did not get far before he was offered work in Arras by the glassworker Peeter Matthys. After six months, he continued on to Paris in 1620, where he worked with the glassworker Chamu. He returned to Utrecht in 1622, where Cornelis Poelenburg taught him to paint. He married Catalijntje van Noort in 1626. He frequented the studio of Gerard van Honthorst. In 1647 he moved to Amsterdam where he created the stained glass windows and the organ doors (almost the only area in a Calvinist church where figurative painting was sometimes allowed) of the Nieuwe Kerk (finished in 1655). He has been described as the last of the great stained glass painters in Holland. Unlike his work for churches, his secular paintings show the influence of Caravaggio, and also show a striking appeal to sensuality.  Among his pupils are counted his sons Jan Jansz and Gerrit Jansz, and Cesar van Everdingen.

References

Sources
 De Bie, Cornelis, biography of Jan Bronckhorst in Het Gulden Cabinet, 1662, p 278, on Google Books

 Web Gallery of Art biography
Jan Gerritsz van Bronckhorst on Artnet

External links

Vermeer and The Delft School, a full text exhibition catalog from The Metropolitan Museum of Art, which contains material on Jan Gerritsz van Bronckhorst

1603 births
1661 deaths
Artists from Utrecht
Dutch Golden Age painters
Dutch male painters
Glass engravers
Dutch stained glass artists and manufacturers
Caravaggisti
Dutch glass artists